This list is of the Natural Monuments of Japan within the Prefecture of Saga.

National Natural Monuments
As of 1 April 2021, fifteen Natural Monuments have been designated; Magpie Habitat spans the prefectural borders with Fukuoka Prefecture and the Southern Native Limit of the Long-tail iris includes areas of Yamaguchi, Ehime, and Miyazaki Prefectures.

Prefectural Natural Monuments
As of 1 May 2020, sixteen Natural Monuments have been designated at a prefectural level.

Municipal Natural Monuments
As of 1 May 2020, fifty-nine Natural Monuments have been designated at a municipal level.

See also
 Cultural Properties of Japan
 Parks and gardens in Saga Prefecture
 List of Places of Scenic Beauty of Japan (Saga)
 List of Historic Sites of Japan (Saga)

References

External links
  Cultural Properties in Saga Prefecture

 Saga
Saga Prefecture